"Feel the Groove" is a song by the Belgian eurodance group Cartouche. It was released in January 1991 as the lead single from their album, House Music All Night Long. A CD maxi with new remixes was also available, but it was marketed at the same time as the other media. The song was their biggest hit, peaking at number 13 in France and charting in the United Kingdom and the United States.

British band Oasis partially covered the song with their unreleased demo track "Better Let You Know", which they recorded circa 1992.

Track listings
 CD maxi (USA, 1991)
 "Feel the Groove" (Sergosonic 7" edit) - 3:40 	
 "Feel the Groove" (Sergosonic mix) - 4:58 	
 "Feel the Groove" (underground remix) - 6:21 	
 "Feel the Groove" (remix) - 5:20

 CD single
 "Feel the Groove" - 5:20 	
 "Feel the Groove" (instrumental) - 4:35

Chart performance

References

1991 singles
Eurodance songs
Cartouche (group) songs
1991 songs